Apatelopteryx is a genus of moths in the family Lasiocampidae. The genus was erected by Yves de Lajonquière in 1968.

Species
Some species of this genus are:
Apatelopteryx deceptrix (Kenrick, 1914)
Apatelopteryx meloui
Apatelopteryx pentheter De Lajonquière, 1968
Apatelopteryx phenax	 De Lajonquière, 1968

References

Lasiocampidae
Moth genera